Alpha Camelopardalis, Latinized from α Camelopardalis, is a star in the northern constellation of Camelopardalis. With an apparent visual magnitude of 4.3, it is the third-brightest star in this not-very-prominent circumpolar constellation; the first and second-brightest stars being Beta Camelopardalis and CS Camelopardalis, respectively. It is the farthest constellational star, with a distance of approximately 6,000 light-years from Earth based on parallax measurements.

Description
Alpha Camelopardalis has a stellar classification of O9 Ia, with the 'Ia' indicating that it is an O-type luminous supergiant. It is a massive star with 37.6 times the mass of the Sun and 32.5 times the Sun's radius. The effective temperature of the outer envelope is 29,000 K; much hotter than the Sun's effective temperature of 5,778 K, giving it the characteristic blue hue of an O-type star. It is emitting 676,000 times the luminosity of the Sun and is a weak X-ray emitter.

Variations in the profiles of Alpha Camelopardalis' spectral lines are caused by fluctuations in the photosphere and stellar wind.  This may be caused by non-radial pulsations.  The absorption lines in the optical spectrum show radial velocity variations, although there is significant uncertainty about the period. Estimates range from a period as low as 0.36 days up to 2.93 days. The stellar wind from this star is not smooth and continuous, but instead shows a behavior indicating clumping at both large and small scales. This star is losing mass rapidly through its stellar wind at a rate of approximately 6.3 × 10−6 solar masses per year, or the equivalent of the mass of the Sun every 160,000 years.

In 1968, this star was classified as a spectroscopic binary, indicating that it has an orbiting stellar companion with a period of 3.68 days and an orbital eccentricity of 0.45. Subsequent studies refined the period to 3.24 days. However, in 2006 it was recognized that the changes in the spectrum were probably the result of changes in the atmosphere or stellar wind, so it is more likely a single star. Speckle interferometry observations with the 3.67 m Advanced Electro Optical System Telescope at the Haleakala Observatory failed to detect a secondary component.

In 1961, based on the criteria that the proper motion of this star indicates a space velocity of greater than 30 km/s, Alpha Camelopardalis was suggested as a candidate runaway star that had been ejected from the cluster NGC 1502. This was based upon the kinematic properties of the star and cluster, as well as the location of this star at a high galactic latitude in an area otherwise lacking in stellar associations. Over the course of a million years, this star should have moved only 1.4° across the sky, while it was estimated as being only two million years old.

Runaway stars such as this with a stellar wind that is moving at supersonic velocity through the interstellar medium have their wind confined by a bow shock due to ram pressure. The dust in this bow shock can be detected using an infrared telescope. Just such a bow shock was observed with NASA's Wide-field Infrared Survey Explorer, or WISE. The star is traveling at a rate of somewhere between 680 and 4,200 kilometers per second: between 1.5 and 9.4 million mph.

Chinese name

References

External links
 HR 1542, entry in the Bright Star Catalogue
 Alpha Camelopardalis in Aladin
 Image of the constellational matrix formed by viewing the constellational lines at 16,000 light-years from the sun. Spike at the left is Alpha Camelopardalis.

O-type supergiants
Emission-line stars
Runaway stars

Camelopardalis (constellation)
Camelopardalis, Alpha
BD+66 0358
Camelopardalis, 09
030614
022783
1542